The Steese National Conservation Area encompasses  of public land about  northeast of Fairbanks, Alaska, and is administered by the Bureau of Land Management as part of the National Landscape Conservation System. Created by the Alaska National Interest Lands Conservation Act in 1980, the Steese NCA's special values include Birch Creek National Wild River, crucial caribou calving grounds and home range, and Dall sheep habitat. While various land uses are allowed in the Steese NCA, the area is managed so that its scenic, scientific, cultural and other resources are protected.

The Steese NCA is split into the North and South Units, located on either side of the Steese Highway. The popular Pinnell Mountain National Recreation Trail skirts the edge of the North Unit.

References
  Steese RNCA

National Conservation Areas of the United States
Protected areas established in 1980
Protected areas of Alaska
Protected areas of Yukon–Koyukuk Census Area, Alaska
Units of the National Landscape Conservation System
Bureau of Land Management areas in Alaska
1980 establishments in Alaska